Miss Heritage South Africa is an Annual South African  beauty pageant which was founded in 2014 that promotes South African Heritage. The winner of the pageant represents her country at the Miss Heritage pageant.

References

Beauty pageants in South Africa
South African awards